Cumberland—Colchester (formerly Cumberland—Colchester—Musquodoboit Valley and North Nova) is a federal electoral district in Nova Scotia, Canada, that has been represented in the House of Commons of Canada since 2004.

Cumberland—Colchester North and Cumberland—Colchester were ridings that covered roughly the same geographic area and were represented in the House of Commons from 1968 to 1979 and 1979 to 2004, respectively.

Demographics

From the 2006 census 

Ethnic groups:
White: 96.1%
First Nations: 1.9%
Black: 1.2%

Languages:
English: 96.5%
French: 1.0%
Other: 2.5%

Religions:
Protestant: 65.7%
Catholic: 17.5%
Other Christian: 1.3%
No religious affiliation: 15.1%

Education:
No certificate, diploma or degree: 31.0%
High school certificate: 24.6%
Apprenticeship or trade certificate or diploma: 12.3%
Community college, CEGEP or other non-university certificate or diploma: 17.7%
University certificate or diploma: 14.3%

Median Age:
43.4

Median total income:
$20,756

Average total income:
$26,779

Median household income:
$41,550

Average household income:
$50,122

Median family income:
$50,353

Average family income:
$58,555

Unemployment:
9.0%

Geography
The district includes the counties of Cumberland, and Colchester.  Communities include the towns of Amherst, Oxford, Parrsboro, Springhill, Stewiacke and Truro, as well as the villages of Bible Hill, Pugwash and Tatamagouche.

History

This riding was created as "Cumberland—Colchester North" in 1966 from Cumberland and Colchester—Hants ridings. It consisted of the county of Cumberland and the northern part of the county of Colchester, including the town of Truro. It was abolished in 1976 when it was merged with the remainder of Colchester County into "Cumberland—Colchester" riding.

Cumberland–Colchester was abolished in 2003. The territory was combined with the largely rural Musquodoboit Valley portion of the Halifax Regional Municipality in a new riding called "North Nova". After the election in 2004, the name was changed to "Cumberland—Colchester—Musquodoboit Valley".

2009 By-election

In early 2009, Incumbent Bill Casey announced he would not be re-offering in the next Federal Election.  He subsequently announced his resignation from Parliament to become the Senior Inter-Governmental Affairs Representative for Nova Scotia in Ottawa.

In April 2009 Scott Armstrong was confirmed as the next Conservative Party candidate in the riding. At the time, he was the president of the provincial Progressive Conservative Party.

In September 2009, Jim Burrows was selected as the next Liberal Party candidate in the riding having defeated 2008 candidate, Tracy Parsons. He received 175 of 206 votes cast. He is a dairy farmer from Green Oaks and Chair of the Board of Directors for Scotsburn Co-operative Services.

Mark Austin was selected to run for the New Democratic Party.

Christian Heritage Party ran Jim Hnatiuk, a retired military officer and the owner of Nova Scotia's largest hunting and fishing store, in Lantz. Hnatiuk was chosen party leader in November 2008.

Green Party leader Elizabeth May had said she was interested in running in the by-election, but subsequently announced she would run in the riding of Saanich-Gulf Islands.  The party instead ran Jason Blanch.

As per the 2012 federal electoral redistribution, this riding was largely dissolved into the new riding 'Cumberland—Colchester', with small portions going to Central Nova and Sackville—Preston—Chezzetcook.

Member of Parliament

These ridings have elected the following Members of Parliament:

Election results

Cumberland—Colchester

2021 general election

2019 general election

2015 general election

Cumberland—Colchester—Musquodoboit Valley

2011 general election

2009 by-election

2008 general election

Incumbent MP Bill Casey, re-elected in 2006 as a member of the Conservative Party, was expelled from the Conservative caucus in 2007 after voting against the 2007 budget, which he objected to on the grounds of alleged violations of the Atlantic Accord. He attempted to run for the Conservative nomination for the next federal election but was refused. Casey therefore ran for re-election as an independent. The Green Party endorsed Casey and did not nominate a candidate opposing his reelection.

2006 general election

North Nova

2004 general election

Cumberland—Colchester

2000 general election

1997 general election

1993 general election

1988 general election

1984 general election

1980 general election

1979 general election

Cumberland–Colchester North

1974 general election

1972 general election

1968 general election

See also
 List of Canadian federal electoral districts
 Past Canadian electoral districts

References

Notes

External links
 Riding history for Cumberland–Colchester North (1966–1976) from the Library of Parliament
 Riding history for Cumberland–Colchester (1976–2003) from the Library of Parliament
 Riding history for North Nova (2003–2004) from the Library of Parliament
 Riding history for Cumberland–Colchester–Musquodoboit Valley (2004– ) from the Library of Parliament

Nova Scotia federal electoral districts
Amherst, Nova Scotia
Politics of Halifax, Nova Scotia
Truro, Nova Scotia